William Chesney "Chez" Reavie (born November 12, 1981) is an American professional golfer who plays on the PGA Tour.

Early career
Reavie was born in Wichita, Kansas. He attended Dobson High School in Mesa, Arizona. He played college golf at Arizona State University.

Reavie played on the Nationwide Tour from 2005 through 2007, where he won once at the 2007 Knoxville Open. He finished 18th on the money list on the Nationwide Tour in 2007 to earn his PGA Tour card.

PGA Tour
Reavie's rookie season on the PGA Tour was in 2008. During this season, on July 27, 2008, Reavie won his maiden PGA Tour title, at the 2008 RBC Canadian Open. The win earned him $900,000 and a two-year exemption to remain on the PGA Tour.

Knee surgery limited Reavie in 2010 and he began the 2011 season on a major medical extension, where he had thirteen events to keep his Tour Card. Reavie did not earn enough to retain full tour privileges, but by merely making the cut at the 2011 Memorial Tournament (the final start of his exemption), he earned conditional status for the rest of 2011. Reavie still managed to play in 22 events, making 15 cuts, and placing high enough to earn a spot in the FedEx Cup playoffs. His earnings of over one million dollars prior to the FedEx Cup secured his 2012 Tour Card. He nearly won for the first time in over three years at the 2011 Deutsche Bank Championship, but had encountered difficulties on the 18th hole, before losing to Webb Simpson on the second extra hole of a playoff. He would finish 10th in the 2011 FedEx Cup standings, 34th on the money list with $2,285,067, and an OWGR rank of 67th after ending 2010 762nd in the world.

After a mediocre 2012 season, that saw Reavie finish 135th on the money list, he went back to Q School to regain his PGA Tour card. He finished T22 and was one of the last players to earn a PGA Tour card through Q School. He is also the last former PGA Tour winner to regain a Tour card in that manner.

Reavie had left wrist surgery and did not play during the 2013–14 season. He was granted 24 starts for the 2014–15 season to satisfy a medical extension.

Reavie earned his second Web.com Tour win and first win in seven years at the 2015 Small Business Connection Championship, the second of four Web.com Tour Finals events. Reavie finished at the top of the Finals money list, which made him fully exempt for the 2015–16 season, regardless of how he performed during the remaining five starts of his medical extension.

In January 2018, Reavie looking to end a 10-year drought on the PGA Tour, lost in a sudden-death playoff at the Waste Management Phoenix Open to Gary Woodland. Having led for the majority of the final round, following a strong finish by Woodland, Reavie had to birdie the 17th and 18th holes to force a playoff. At the first extra hole, both players missed the green with their approaches, but Reavie played a poor chip shot and missed the par putt, allowing Woodland to win with a par. This was however Reavie's best result on tour since 2011. The following week, Reavie finished as a runner-up again at the AT&T Pebble Beach Pro-Am, three strokes behind Ted Potter Jr.

On June 16, 2019, Reavie finished tied for 3rd at the U.S. Open at Pebble Beach Golf Links in Pebble Beach, California. This marked not only Reavie's best performance in a major championship, but was also the first time he had placed in the top 10. The result also moved Reavie back into the world's top 50.

On June 23, 2019, Reavie captured his second PGA Tour win at the Travelers Championship, ending a near eleven-year drought. He carried the 54-hole lead of six strokes over the chasing pack. He got chased down by Keegan Bradley and held just a one-shot advantage, as the pair walked up the 17th. Reavie birdied the hole while Bradley made a double-bogey six, sealing what would end up being a four-stroke victory. As of June 24, 2019, Reavie was ranked 26th in the Official World Golf Ranking, the highest ranking of his career.

Amateur wins
 2001 U.S. Amateur Public Links

Professional wins (5)

PGA Tour wins (3)

1Co-sanctioned by the European Tour

PGA Tour playoff record (0–2)

European Tour wins (1)

1Co-sanctioned by the PGA Tour

Web.com Tour wins (2)

Results in major championships
Results not in chronological order in 2020.

CUT = missed the half-way cut
"T" indicates a tie for a place
NT = No tournament due to COVID-19 pandemic

Summary

 Most consecutive cuts made – 4 (2012 PGA – 2018 Masters)
 Longest streak of top-10s – 1

Results in The Players Championship

CUT = missed the halfway cut
"T" indicates a tie for a place
C = Canceled after the first round due to the COVID-19 pandemic

Results in World Golf Championships
Results not in chronological order before 2015.

1Cancelled due to COVID-19 pandemic

NT = no tournament
"T" = tied
Note that the HSBC Champions did not become a WGC event until 2009.

See also
 2007 Nationwide Tour graduates
 2012 PGA Tour Qualifying School graduates
 2015 Web.com Tour Finals graduates

References

External links
 
 

American male golfers
Arizona State Sun Devils men's golfers
PGA Tour golfers
Korn Ferry Tour graduates
Golfers from Wichita, Kansas
Golfers from Scottsdale, Arizona
1981 births
Living people